Torre, also known as torre.co, is an online employment website, mainly focused on remote work roles. It was founded as a startup company in 2019 by Colombian-American entrepreneur Alexander Torrenegra, who is also its CEO.

According to its founder, Torre uses artificial intelligence to help people find jobs in any country.

Company overview and history 
Torre’s primary focus is on remote work in software development, design, marketing, management, sales, customer service, etc. Opportunities can be for full-time jobs, flexible work, or internships. Users create a “genome,” a profile that serves as an expanded résumé and includes information about their skills, experience, salary expectations, location and language preferences, personality traits, etc.

The platform’s algorithm suggests job openings that match the potential candidate’s skills and preferences with a job opening's requirements. Posting job opportunities, applying to them, or hiring a candidate is free, although there’s the option of paying, so Torre handles the whole process on behalf of the users.

Torre is mainly owned by Emma, a holding company co-founded by Alexander Torrenegra, his wife Tania Zapata, and Santiago Jaramillo in 2019, which encompasses other of Torrenegra’s companies, like Bunny Studio and Tribe.

The names "Torre" and "Emma" were inspired by María Emma Torrenegra, Alexander’s maternal grandmother and one of his role models growing up. Torre also means “tower” in Spanish and other five romance languages.

In 2020, Torre reached 1 million users and extended its presence to 180 countries. Next year, 2021, Torre allied with Endeavor Colombia as a "Second Company", which refers to a company that joins through an Endeavor entrepreneur that already has one company in their network. Two of Torre’s founders, Andrés Cajiao and Daniela Ávila, were admitted to join Alexander Torrenegra as Endeavor entrepreneurs. The same year, Torre launched Torre Access, an accelerator for individuals to help them land better remote jobs in tech through coaching. A hundred professionals enrolled in its first cohort. It also secured a $10 million seed round led by former executives from Apple, Facebook, Uber, and SpaceX, to continue growing.

By 2022, Torre added cryptocurrencies (Bitcoin and Ethereum) to its list of compensation options for job opportunities.

References 

Employment websites
Internet properties established in 2019